NGC 4696 is an elliptical galaxy. It is the brightest galaxy in the Centaurus Cluster, a large, rich cluster of galaxies in the constellation of the same name. The galaxy is surrounded by many dwarf elliptical galaxies also located within the cluster. There is believed to be a supermassive black hole at the center of the galaxy.

References

External links
 
http://www.eurekalert.org/pub_releases/2010-08/eic-n4a081010.php
http://apod.nasa.gov/apod/ap161207.html

Elliptical galaxies
Peculiar galaxies
Centaurus Cluster
Centaurus (constellation)
4696
43296